The 2015 Amarillo Venom season was the team's twelfth season as a professional indoor football franchise, sixth as the "Amarillo Venom", and first as a member of Champions Indoor Football (CIF). The Venom were led by head coach Julian Reese. The defensive coordinator was Daniel Snyder, receivers coach was John King, assistant coach was Barrett Allen, wide receivers coach was Craig Fulton, special teams coach was Donna Welch, and the trainer was Nathan Johnson.

The Venom were the 2013 champions of the Lone Star Football League, just one season before it merged with the Champions Professional Indoor Football League and several other teams to form Champions Indoor Football. The Venom were one of nine teams in the CIF for the 2015 season. The Venom played their home games at the Amarillo Civic Center in Amarillo, Texas.

Season summary
The Venom's announced schedule for the 2015 season was disrupted when the New Mexico Stars abruptly postponed their entry into the league on February 21, just one week before the season began. On March 3, the Albuquerque-based Duke City Gladiators were announced as a late entry into the league, partially replacing the Stars in the CIF schedule with a plan to play 11 games in 2015. The Gladiators' schedule has them visiting the Venom once in April and hosting the Venom once in May, just as the Stars were supposed to, but replaces the originally scheduled March 14 road game against New Mexico with a home game against the Dodge City Law.

The Venom hosted a number of themed nights and special events at and before home games during the season. Education Night on April 25 offered family packs of 4 tickets for $20 plus a free youth-sized replica Venom jersey for the first 500 children.
 On May 2, the tea, held both a "Head to Toe Expo" offering makeup and fashion tips and a "Mother/Daughter Football Clinic" where coaches answered questions, offered insights, and had participants run plays on the field to better understand the game.

Awards and honors
Each week of the regular season, the CIF names league-wide Players of the Week in offensive, defensive, and special teams categories. For Week 2, the CIF named quarterback Nate Davis as the Offensive Player of the Week. For Week 7, the CIF named defensive linesman Silvio Diaz as the Defensive Player of the Week and kicker Jacob Felton as the Special Teams Player of the Week. For Week 10, the CIF named linebacker Blake Adams as the Defensive Player of the Week and kicker Jacob Felton as the Special Teams Player of the Week.

Schedule
Key:

Regular season

 Rescheduled after the New Mexico Stars withdrew from the league on February 22, 2015.

Post-season

Roster

Standings

Playoffs

References

External links
Amarillo Venom at Our Sports Central

Amarillo Venom seasons
Amarillo Venom
Amarillo Venom